Nicholas Keynes Humphrey (born 27 March 1943) is an English neuropsychologist based in Cambridge, known for his work on evolution of primate intelligence and consciousness. He studied mountain gorillas with Dian Fossey in Rwanda; he was the first to demonstrate the existence of "blindsight" after brain damage in monkeys; he proposed the theory of the "social function of intellect". He is the only scientist to have edited the literary journal Granta.

Humphrey played a significant role in the anti-nuclear movement in the late 1970s and delivered the BBC Bronowski memorial lecture titled "Four Minutes to Midnight" in 1981. 
 
His 10 books include Consciousness Regained, The Inner Eye, A History of the Mind, Leaps of Faith, The Mind Made Flesh, Seeing Red, and Soul Dust. He has received several honours, including the Martin Luther King Memorial Prize, the Pufendorf Medal and the British Psychological Society's book award.
 
He has been lecturer in psychology at Oxford, assistant director of the Subdepartment of Animal Behaviour at Cambridge, senior research fellow at Cambridge, professor of psychology at the New School for Social Research, New York, and school professor at the London School of Economics.

Family

Humphrey is the son of the immunologist John H. Humphrey and his wife Janet Humphrey (née Hill), daughter of the Nobel Prize–winning physiologist Archibald Hill and the social reformer Margaret Hill. His great uncle was the economist John Maynard Keynes. Humphrey married Caroline Waddington, daughter of C. H. Waddington, in 1967 (divorced 1977). From 1977 to 1984 he was the partner of the English actress Susannah York. in 1994 he married Ayla Kohn, with whom he has two children, Ada (born 1995) and Samuel (born 1997).

Early career

Nicholas Humphrey was educated at Westminster School (1956–61) and Trinity College, Cambridge (1961–67).

His doctoral research at Cambridge, supervised by Lawrence Weiskrantz, was on the neuropsychology of vision in primates. He made the first single cell recordings from the superior colliculus of monkeys, and discovered the existence of a previously unsuspected capacity for vision after total lesions of the striate cortex (a capacity which, when it was later confirmed in human beings, came to be called "blindsight").

On moving to Oxford, he turned his attention to evolutionary aesthetics. He did research on monkey visual preferences (especially colour preferences) and wrote the essay "The Illusion of beauty", which, as a radio broadcast, won the Glaxo Science Writers Prize in 1980.

Work in evolutionary psychology and philosophy of mind

He returned to Cambridge, to the Sub Department of Animal Behaviour in 1970, and there met Dian Fossey, who invited him to spend three months at her gorilla study camp in Rwanda. His experience with the gorillas, and a subsequent visit to Richard Leakey's field-site on Lake Turkana, set Humphrey thinking about how cognitive skills  – intelligence and consciousness – could have arisen as an adaption to social life. In 1976 he wrote an essay titled "The Social Function of Intellect", which is widely regarded as one of the foundational works of evolutionary psychology and the basis for Machiavellian intelligence theory. This paper formed the basis of his first book, Consciousness Regained: Chapters in the Development of Mind (1983).

In 1984 Humphrey left his academic post at Cambridge to work on his Channel 4 television series The Inner Eye, on the development of the human mind. This series was finished in 1986 with the release of a book of the same name.

In 1987, Daniel Dennett invited Humphrey to work with him at his Center for Cognitive Studies at Tufts University. They worked on developing an empirically based theory of consciousness, and undertook a study on Multiple Personality Disorder.

Humphrey's next book, A History of the Mind (1992), put forward a theory on how consciousness as feeling rather than thinking may have evolved. This book won the inaugural British Psychological Society's annual Book of the Year Award in 1993.

His writings on consciousness continued in The Mind Made Flesh: Essays from the Frontiers of Evolution and Psychology (2002), Seeing Red: A Study in Consciousness (2006), and most recently Soul Dust: the Magic of Consciousness (2011). In this last book he puts forward a radical new theory. Consciousness, he argues, is nothing less than  a magical-mystery show that we stage inside our own heads  – a show that paves the way for spirituality, and allows us to reap  the rewards, and anxieties, of living in what he calls the "soul niche".

Other work

Humphrey became active in the anti-nuclear movement in the late 1970s. This led to an invitation to deliver the Bronowski lecture on the BBC in 1981. He titled his lecture, on the dangers of the arms race, "Four Minutes to Midnight". With Robert Lifton he edited an anthology of writings on war and peace, In a Dark Time, which was released in 1984 and was awarded the Martin Luther King Memorial Prize.

In 1992, Humphrey was appointed to a Senior Research Fellowship at Darwin College, Cambridge funded by the Perrott-Warwick Fellowship in parapsychology. He undertook a sceptical study of parapsychological phenomena such as extra-sensory perception and psychokinesis, resulting in his book Soul Searching: Human Nature and Supernatural Belief (1995) (in America this book was published under the title Leaps of Faith).

Humphrey has worked on a number of TV and radio documentaries as well as The Inner Eye. The topics range from the psychology of paranormal belief to the psycho-history of mediaeval animal trials.

In 2005, he visited the Ulas family of human quadrupeds in southern Turkey and published a report on them with John Skoyles and Roger Keynes. A documentary entitled The Family That Walks on All Fours based on this visit was broadcast on BBC2 in March 2006, and on NOVA in November 2006.

Over the last ten years Humphrey has been investigating the placebo effect, and has put forward a novel theory with John Skoyles of what he calls the "health management system" through which the brain has top-down control over the body's healing resources.

He has recently become an Advisor to the BMW Guggenheim Lab, and in 2016 he gave the annual Medawar Lecture at UCL.

Humphrey is an atheist and suggested the analogy of religion to viruses to Richard Dawkins.

National Life Stories conducted an oral history interview (C1672/12) with Nicholas Humphrey in 2016 for its Science and Religion collection held by the British Library.

Bibliography
Consciousness Regained: Chapters in the Development of Mind, Oxford University Press, 1983.
In a Dark Time, (ed. with R. J. Lifton), Faber & Faber 1984, Harvard University Press, 1984.
The Inner Eye: Social Intelligence in Evolution, Faber & Faber, 1986; Oxford University Press 2002,  
A History of the Mind, Chatto & Windus 1992, Simon & Schuster, 1992.
Soul Searching: Human Nature and Supernatural Belief, Chatto & Windus, 1995.
How to Solve the Mind-Body Problem, Imprint Academic, 2000.
The Mind Made Flesh: Essays from the Frontiers of Evolution and Psychology, Oxford University Press, 2002.
Seeing Red: A Study in Consciousness, Belknap Press/Harvard University Press, 2006.
Soul Dust: The Magic of Consciousness, Quercus Publishing, 2011, Princeton University Press, 2011
Sentience: The Invention of Consciousness, The MIT Press, 2023

Video links

 .
 .
 .
 .
 .
 .
 "The Pufendorf Lectures 2011".

Journal articles

 "Vision in monkeys after removal of the striate cortex", Nature, 215, 515–597, 1967.
 "Contrast illusions in perspective", Nature, 232, 91- 93, 1971.
 "Interest and pleasure: two determinants of a monkey’s visual preferences", Perception, 1, 395–416, 1972.
 "The illusion of beauty", Perception, 2, 429–39, 1973.
 "The apparent heaviness of colours", Nature, 250, 164–165, 1974. (With E. Pinkerton.)
 "The reaction of monkeys to fearsome pictures", Nature, 251, 500–2, 1974.
 "Vision in a monkey without striate cortex: a case study", Perception, 3, 241–55, 1974.
 "Species and individuals in the perceptual world of monkeys", Perception, 3, 105–14, 1974.
 "Interactive effects of unpleasant light and unpleasant sound", Nature, 253, 346–347, 1975. (With G. R. Keeble.)
 "How monkeys acquire a new way of seeing", Perception, 5, 51–56, 1976.
 "Unfoldings of mental life", Science, 196, 755–756, 1977.
 "Do monkeys subjective clocks run faster in red light than in blue", Perception, 6, 7–14.
 "Effects of red light and loud noise on the rate at which monkeys sample the sensory environment", Perception 7:343–348 1978.
 "Speaking for our selves: an assessment of multiple personality disorder", Raritan, 9, 68–98.
 "Varieties of altruism – and the common ground between them", Social Research 64:199–209, 1997.
 "Cave art, autism and the evolution of the human mind", Cambridge Archaeological Journal, 8, 165–191, 1998.
 "Why Grandmothers May Need Large Brains", Psycoloquy 10(024), 1999.
 "How to solve the mind-body problem", Journal of Consciousness Studies 7(4):5–20 2000.
 "In Reply (Reply to Commentaries on How to Solve the Mind-Body Problem)", Journal of Consciousness Studies 7(4):98–112, 2000.
 "One Self: a Meditation on the Unity of Consciousness", Social Research 67(4):32–39 2000.
 "Dreaming as play", Behavioral and Brain Science, 23, 953, 2000.
 "Shamanism and cognitive evolution (Commentary on Michael Winkelman)", Cambridge Archaeological Journal, 12, 91–3, 2002.
 "Human handwalkers: five siblings who never stood up", CPNSS Discussion Paper, DP 77/05, 2005.
 "The society of selves", Philosophical Transactions of the Royal Society, 362, 745–754, 2007.
 "Getting the measure of consciousness", Progress of Theoretical Physics Supplement, 2008.

Other works 

 "The social function of intellect". In Growing Points in Ethology, ed. P. P. G. Bateson and R. A. Hinde, pp. 303– 317, Cambridge University Press, Cambridge, 1976.
 "Nature's Psychologists". In Josephson, B. D. and Ramachandran, V. S. (eds), Consciousness and the Physical World, chapter 4, 57–80. Oxford: Pergamon Press, 1980.
 "Status and the left cheek", New Scientist, 59, 437–49, 1973.
 "The colour currency of nature". In Colour for Architecture, T. Porter and B. Mikellides (eds), pp. 95–98, Studio-Vista, London, 1976.
 "The biological basis of collecting", Human Nature 44–47 1979.
 "Natural aesthetics2. In Architecture for People, ed. B. Mikellides, pp. 59–73, Studio-Vista, London, 1980.
 "Four Minutes to Midnight". The BBC Bronowski Lecture, 1981.
 "Consciousness: a Just-So story", New Scientist, 95 473–477, 1982.
 "What shall we tell the children?" In Williams, Wes (ed.), The Values of Science (The 1997 Oxford Amnesty Lectures), 58–79. Westview Press, 1998.
 "The Uses of Consciousness". Fifteenth James Arthur Memorial Lecture, 1–25, American Museum of Natural History, New York,  1987.
 "The Placebo Effect". In Gregory, Richard L. (ed.), Oxford Companion to the Mind. Second Edition, Oxford University Press, 2004.
 "Thinking about Feeling". In Gregory, Richard L. (ed.), Oxford Companion to the Mind. Second Edition, Oxford University Press, 2004.
 "The Privatization of Sensation". In Heyes, Celia and Huber, Ludwig (eds), The Evolution of Cognition, 241–252. MIT, Cambridge, Ma, 2000.
 
 "Killer Instinct: a Review of Niall Ferguson's "World of War: History's Century of Hatred", Prospect, September 2006
 "Consciousness: the Achilles heel of Darwinism? Thank God, not quite". In Intelligent Thought: Science versus the Intelligent Design Movement, ed. John Brockman, pp. 50–64, New York: Vintage, 2006.
 "Great Expectations: The Evolutionary Psychology of Faith-Healing and the Placebo Effect" , The Mind Made Flesh: Essays from the Frontiers of Psychology and Evolution, chapter 19, 255–85, Oxford University Press, 2002.
 "Questioning consciousness", Seed Magazine, January/February,30-32, 2008.
 "Follow My Leader". In Humphrey, Nicholas, The Mind Made Flesh: Essays from the Frontiers of Evolution and Psychology, chapter 24, 330–339. Oxford University Press, 2002.
 "The Deformed Transformed". In Humphrey, Nicholas, The Mind Made Flesh: Essays from the Frontiers of Psychology and Evolution, chapter 14, 165–199. Oxford University Press 2002.
 "Bugs and Beasts before the Law", The Mind Made Flesh: Essays from the Frontiers of Psychology and Evolution, chapter 18, 235–254, Oxford University Press 2002.
 "Behold the Man". In Humphrey, Nicholas, The Mind Made Flesh: Essays from the Frontiers of Psychology and Evolution, chapter 16, 206–231, Oxford University Press, 2002.
 "A Family Affair". In Curious Minds: How a Child Becomes a Scientist , ed. John Brockman, pp. 3–12, New York: Pantheon Books, 2004.
 "Do babies know what they look like? Doppelgängers and the phenomenology of infancy". In Susan Hurley and Nick Chater (eds), Perspectives on Imitation: From Cognitive Neuroscience to Social Science. Cambridge: MIT Press (2005)
 "Beauty’s child: sexual selection, nature worship and the love of God".

References

External links
 Professor Humphrey's home page
 
 The human factor by Andrew Brown. 29 July 2006, The Guardian.  Newspaper interview.
 EDGE talk, A Self worth having A Talk with Nicholas Humphrey Interview on EDGE 30 June 2003
  Video
 Pufendorf Lectures 2011
 "The Evolved Self-Management System", EDGE, 5 December 1011
 The Moscow Center for Consciousness Studies interview with Nicholas Humphrey
 New York Times review of Soul Dust
 Guardian review of Soul Dust

1943 births
Academics of the London School of Economics
British psychologists
British consciousness researchers and theorists
Critics of parapsychology
English atheists
English sceptics
Evolutionary psychologists
Human evolution theorists
Fellows of Darwin College, Cambridge
Living people
Keynes family
Theoretical biologists
Reeves family